Interkommunalt selskap or IKS (in English: Intermunicipal company) is a type of municipal or county owned company in Norway. It resembles very closely a Municipal Enterprise (Kommunalt foretak) or County Enterprise, but the IKS requires multiple municipalities and/or counties to be owners. The form is regulated by the Municipal Act. Typical activities organised as IKS's include waterworks, archives, museums and garbage disposal.

References

See also 
 Local federation, a similar organization in Sweden

Norwegian words and phrases
Types of companies of Norway